The 1950 Florida Gators football team represented the University of Florida during the 1950 college football season. The season was Bob Woodruff's first of ten as the new head coach of the Florida Gators football team. Woodruff was a former college football player and assistant for coach Robert Neyland's Tennessee Volunteers, who made his name as an up-and-coming young head coach leading the Baylor Bears for three seasons in the late 1940s. Like Neyland, Woodruff emphasized stout defense, the kicking game and a ball control offense. In Woodruff's first season of 1950, the Gators offense, led by quarterback Haywood Sullivan and offensive coordinator Frank Broyles, posted record numbers. Sullivan was the first sophomore in SEC history to throw for more than 1,000 yards in a season. He set nine school records. The highlights of the season included two Southeastern Conference (SEC) victories over the Auburn Tigers (27–7) and the No. 13-ranked Vanderbilt Commodores (31–27)—the first season since 1940 in which the Gators won two or more SEC games. The Gators' No. 20 ranking after the Vanderbilt game marked their first-ever appearance in the top twenty of the weekly Associated Press Poll. Woodruff's 1950 Florida Gators finished 5–5 overall and 2–4 in the SEC, placing tenth among twelve conference teams.

Also of note, lights were installed at Florida Field during the summer of 1950, and the Gators opened the season with their first home night game, a 7–3 win over The Citadel.

Schedule

Notes

References

Florida
Florida Gators football seasons
Florida Gators football